USS LST-969 was an  in the United States Navy. Like many of her class, she was not named and is properly referred to by her hull designation.

Construction
LST-969 was laid down on 10 November 1944, at Hingham, Massachusetts, by the Bethlehem-Hingham Shipyard; launched on 13 December 1944; and commissioned on 9 January 1945.

Service history
Following World War II, LST-969 performed logistic services between Hawaii and the west coast of the United States in 1945 and 1946, while assigned to the United States Pacific Fleet. She was decommissioned on 12 July 1946, and struck from the Navy list on 15 August, that same year. On 25 April 1947, the ship was sold to Trailer-ships, Inc., for operation.

References

Bibliography

External links
 

 

LST-542-class tank landing ships
World War II amphibious warfare vessels of the United States
Ships built in Hingham, Massachusetts
1944 ships